Gefrees is a town in the district of Bayreuth, in Bavaria, Germany. It is situated in the Fichtelgebirge, 21 km northeast of Bayreuth. It was the site of a battle during the Napoleonic Wars.

References

Bayreuth (district)